Aldir Mendes de Souza (1941, São Paulo –2007) was a Brazilian painter and physician. 

Mendes de Souza's work includes Paisagem Agrícola, which was auctioned at James Lisboa Auction in 2019, Côres do Campo (1987) auctioned in 2010, Planos agricolas no. 20 (1987) auctioned in 2009, Planos agricolas nr. 11 (1987) auctioned in 2007.

References 

1941 births
2007 deaths
20th-century Brazilian painters
20th-century Brazilian male artists